Geneva Mendoza Cruz (born April 2, 1976) is a multi-platinum Filipina singer and actress known for her hit songs, “Anak Ng Pasig” (Son/Daughter of Pasig) and “Kailan” (When). She was discovered and mentored by National Artist of the Philippines for Music, Ryan Cayabyab who formed the defunct iconic music group Smokey Mountain, which she was a member of. She just recently moved back to Manila, The Philippines, from The United States, where she worked as A weight-loss coach for a few years.

On March 9, 2022, Geneva Cruz earned the rank of sergeant under the Philippine Air Force Reserve Command after she graduated from its four-month military training.

Personal life
Geneva Cruz was born in Gagalangin, Tondo, Manila. One of the great-grand daughters of Tirso Cruz, Sr., Geneva hails from the famous Cruz clan of Philippine showbiz which includes actors like Tirso Cruz III, Sunshine Cruz, Sheryl Cruz, and Donna Cruz. She is also the cousin of actor-dancer Rayver Cruz, Rodjun Cruz, and lounge singer Glenda Cruz.  Aside from singing, Geneva also dances, and occasionally writes songs and plays guitar.

She dated former MTV VJ KC Montero in 1999 and was married from 2004 until 2010. She has a son named Heaven Arespacochaga, with musician Paco Arespacochaga.

In August 2013, Cruz got engaged to a Filipino – Australian named Lee Paulsen but later on decided to break off the engagement.

On May 10, 2014, Cruz gave birth to a healthy baby girl named London (with her ex fiance), and is currently living in Manila, Philippines, with her.

On August 11, 2019, she announced she's dating Nikolaus Booth, an American concert producer and former United States Marine from Virginia, but broke up after a year of dating. 

Geneva Cruz received the most number of votes and won the 2009 Sexiest Vegetarian in the Philippines, and then posed for a PETA campaign  (People for Ethical Treatment of Animals) with only markings on her body and nothing more. On the same month, Geneva posed naked again for her love of Mother Nature in the music and environment issue of Maxim Philippines. 

Cruz has been a long-time Environmentalist and an Animal Rights advocate.

In 2013, Geneva joined the PETA campaign to free Mali, an elephant currently in captivity at the Manila Zoo, and have her transferred to Boon Lott's Elephant Sanctuary in Thailand. She posed for a photo shoot with Sanya Smith, Amanda Griffin, Ornussa Cadness, Mia Ayesa, Julia Sniegowski, Sheena Vera Cruz, and Daiana Menezes; all who were asking for Mali to be freed.

Cruz regularly lends her social media platform to promote body positivity and the importance of self-love.

Career
Cruz began her career in 1989 as one of the lead singers of the popular group Smokey Mountain. The Smokey Mountain album went double platinum. She was also the very first Grand Prize winner (and the youngest) of "The Voice of Asia" in Alma-Ata, Kazakhstan, Russia in 1992. Cruz's first solo album, I Like You, went double platinum The album produced several hit singles, including the title track and "Anak ng Pasig" (from the movie of the same title) in which Geneva appeared. "Anak Ng Pasig," was also chosen as Best Pop Song by the 1992 Catholic Mass Media Awards. Her second solo album In the Name of Love went platinum and produced hits like "Ang Gaan ng Feeling" and "In the Name of Love".

Cruz's most recent album was released in August 2013 entitled, To Manila.

She just recently moved back to Manila, Philippines to pursue acting and to continue performing around the world. Aside from singing and acting, Geneva also dances and plays the guitar.

Filmography

Film

Television

Discography

Albums
Smokey Mountain
I Like You
In The Name Of Love
On Fire!
Geneva
To Manila

Single
Sinungaling (2021)

Awards
Grand Prize Winner (Kazakhstan)- Voice of Asia in 1992
Catholic Mass Media Awards – Best song for Anak ng Pasig
Awit Awards- Smokey Mountain won 11 awards, 1990
Awit Award- Anak ng Pasig, 1992 
Catholic Mass Media Awards- Best Pop Song, 1992
Guillermo Memorial Awards, 1992 
FAMAS International Award, 2001

References

External links

1976 births
Living people
Geneva
People from Tondo, Manila
Singers from Manila
Actresses from Manila
Survivor Philippines contestants
21st-century Filipino actresses
Filipino television actresses
GMA Network personalities
21st-century Filipino women singers